Tjipekapora Herunga (born 1 January 1988 in Ehangono) is a Namibian sprinter who specialises in the 400 metres. She represented her country at the 2012 Summer Olympics as well as two outdoor and two indoor World Championships.

She is her country's national record holder in the 400 metres both outdoors and indoors. She broke the record while representing Namibia at the 2007 All-Africa Games.

Competition record

Personal bests
Outdoor
200 metres – 23.40 (+0.4 m/s, Pretoria 2012)
400 metres – 51.24 (Pretoria 2012) NR
800 metres – 2:16.52 (Windhoek 2005)
Indoor
400 metres – 55.40 (Doha 2010) NR

References 

1988 births
Living people
Namibian female sprinters
Athletes (track and field) at the 2012 Summer Olympics
Athletes (track and field) at the 2016 Summer Olympics
Athletes (track and field) at the 2015 African Games
Athletes (track and field) at the 2019 African Games
Olympic athletes of Namibia
People from Oshana Region
African Games bronze medalists for Namibia
African Games medalists in athletics (track and field)
Olympic female sprinters